Charlotte Golar Richie (born December 11, 1958 in Brooklyn) serves as the senior vice president for public policy, advocacy and government relations for YouthBuild USA. She was a candidate for the mayor of Boston in the 2013 election.

Early life
Charlotte Golar graduated from Rutgers University and then tried her hand at acting, appearing off-Broadway and in minor roles on soap operas. She spent two years with the Peace Corps in Kenya teaching English to schoolchildren, spurring an interest in journalism and public service. She also met her future husband, another volunteer, in Kenya.  Golar returned to the United States where she earned a master's degree at the Columbia University School of Journalism and married Winston Richie.

Government

Richie represented the 5th Suffolk District in the Massachusetts House of Representatives from 1995 until she resigned in 1999 to become the Executive Director of the Department of Neighborhood Development for the City of Boston. As a freshman legislator, she was elected vice-chair of the city's State House delegation and chair of the Housing and Urban Development Committee, the first time in three decades that a freshman won a leadership position. As a State Representative, Richie sponsored a $296 million housing bond bill to develop low-cost housing.

Richie's appointment to Chief of Housing and Director of the Department of Neighborhood Development coincided with Mayor Thomas Menino's decision to elevate the post to a cabinet position. She remained with the DND until 2007 when she became Governor Deval Patrick's senior advisor for federal, state and community affairs. In 2009, she left the Patrick administration to become the executive director of the Governor's re-election committee.

She ran as a nonpartisan candidate for Mayor of Boston in 2013, the city's first election in 20 years without incumbent Mayor Thomas Menino running. In the primary election on September 25, she came in third with 14% of the vote, falling short of advancing to the general election in November. Polling near the close of the primary election campaign had placed her in the top-tier of candidates, along with John R. Connolly and Marty Walsh. Unlike the other two polling in the top-tier of candidates, however, Richie lacked the campaign finances needed to run an advertisement blitz in advance of the primary election. After being eliminated in the primary, she endorsed Walsh over Connolly in the general election.

From 2014 to 2017, Richie was as a Commissioner of the Massachusetts Commission Against Discrimination.

In 2021, Richie served as a co-chair of the committee overseeing Michelle Wu's transition into the office of mayor of Boston.

YouthBuild USA
Since 2010, Richie has worked for YouthBuild USA, a youth and community development program based in Somerville, Massachusetts. She also serves as chair of the board of Higher Ground Boston, as an advisor to Mothers for Justice and Equality and on the advisory council of the Haiti Fund at The Boston Foundation.

Electoral history

State House
1994

1996

1998

Mayor

References

1958 births
Columbia University Graduate School of Journalism alumni
Living people
Democratic Party members of the Massachusetts House of Representatives
Politicians from Boston
Rutgers University alumni
Women state legislators in Massachusetts
21st-century American women